Peace Kusasira also referred to as Kusasira Peace Kanyesigye Mubiru (born 27 February 1962) is a female Ugandan politician and Social Worker. She is the district woman representative of Mukono District under the National Resistance Movement political party. She served as the MP in the tenth, and ninth parliament and lost in the 2021–2026 elections. In the ninth parliament, Peace Kusasira, took the seat from outgoing MP, Margaret Nalugo (who moved to Mukono South and lost to Bakaluba Mukasa).

Education background 
In 1975, she completed her Primary Leaving Examinations from Bugamba Boys Primary School. In 1980, she joined Bweranyangi Girls S.S for Uganda Certificate of Education. In 1982, she obtained Uganda Advanced Certificate of Education from St Mary's Namagunga S.S and later joined Makerere University for Bachelor of Social Work and Social Administration in 1986.

Career 
Between 1986 and 1989, she was the Personnel Administrator at PAPCO Industries, Jinja. From 1992 to 2000, she was employed as the Director for Women and Youth at National Organization of Trade Unions. From 2001 to 2011, she was the Director at Pasip Tribute Junior School.

Political career 
From 2011 to 2021, she was the Member of Parliament at the Parliament of Uganda.

She served on additional role as the Member on Committee on HIV/AIDS & Related Disease and Committee on Agriculture. She sits on the UWOPA Round Table Committees.

Personal life 
She is married to Mubiru Kusasira with three children. Her hobbies are listening to religious music and farming. She has special interests in mobilizing people for poverty eradication.

See also 

 List of members of the tenth Parliament of Uganda
 National Resistance Movement
 Hanifa Nabukeera
 List of members of the ninth Parliament of Uganda
 Mukono District
 Parliament of Uganda
 Member of Parliament

External links 

 Website of the Parliament of Uganda
 Peace Kusasira on Facebook

References 

Living people
1962 births
Makerere University alumni
Ugandan social workers
Women members of the Parliament of Uganda
Members of the Parliament of Uganda
People from Mukono District